Chanika may refer to:

 Emmie Chanika - a Malawian human rights activist.
 Chanika (Tanzanian ward)